Raghu Balaiah, popularly known as Junior Balaiah (born 28 June 1953) is an Indian actor who has appeared in Tamil language films. The son of actor T. S. Balaiah, Junior Balaiah has primarily featured in supporting roles throughout his career, which has stretched over forty years.

Personal life

Junior Balaiah was born in Chennai as Raghu Balaiah on 28 June 1953. He was the third son of actor T. S. Balaiah. His home is Sundankottai, now in Thoothukudi district, Tamil Nadu. For personal reasons, he turned to Evangelism following Christianity.

Career
T. S. Balaiah died three days into Junior Balaiah's first film as an actor. T. S. Balaiah was to act in a movie directed by M. R. Radha called Suttaan Sutten, in which Radha's son was to be played by Junior Balaiah and Balaiah's son was to be played by M. R. R. Vasu, but his death ended the production. Junior Balaiah consequently acted in several films but failed to recreate the success of his father. He subsequently became bankrupt and later began to practice Christianity, setting up a healing centre called Healing Stripes Ministry.

In the 2010s, Balaiah made rare appearances in films and won acclaim for his portrayal of a headmaster in Saattai (2012). He appeared in four films in 2015 including Thani Oruvan and Puli.

In 2014, Balaiah revealed his intentions of becoming a film producer to launch his son's acting career.

Selected filmography

Melnaattu Marumagal (1975)
Ilaya Thalaimurai (1977)
Thyagam (1978)
Yamanukku Yaman (1980)
Vazhvey Maayam (1982)
Dhooram Adhighamillai (1983)
Anbe Odi Vaa (1984)
Karagattakaran (1989)
Gopura Vasalile (1991)
Vigneshwar (1991)
Chinna Thayee (1992)
Amma Vanthachu (1992)
Raasukutti (1992)
Sundara Kandam (1992)
Amaravathi (1993) as Rickshaw driver
Enga Muthalali (1993)
Pavithra (1994)
Veetla Visheshanga (1994)
Avatharam (1995)
Mayabazar (1995)
Irattai Roja (1996)
Pudhu Nilavu (1996)
Vaettiya Madichu Kattu (1996)
Kadhal Palli (1997)
Vivasaayi Magan (1997)
Cheran Chozhan Pandian (1998)
Bharathi (2000)
Aandan Adimai (2001)
Shakalaka Baby (2002)
Julie Ganapathi (2003)
Jayam (2003)
Winner (2003)
Sringaram (2007)
Vattapaarai (2012)
Saattai (2012)
Kumki (2012)
Aindhaam Thalaimurai Sidha Vaidhiya Sigamani (2014)
Thunai Mudhalvar (2015)
Thani Oruvan (2015)
Puli (2015)
Om Shanthi Om (2015)
Sethu Boomi (2016)
Narai (2018)
Koothan (2018)
Nerkonda Parvai (2019)
Sanga thalaivan(2021)
Cameo as Retired school teacher and Communist hiding in forest
Maara (2021)
Yennanga Sir Unga Sattam (2021)

Web series
 Mugilan

Television
Chithi (2000–2001) as James
Vazhkai (2000-2001) as Prabhakar's fatherChinna Papa Periya Papa'' (2014) Season 1 as Masanam

References

External links

1953 births
Living people
Male actors in Tamil cinema
21st-century Indian male actors
Tamil comedians